Jorge Alberto Solís López (1 January 1935 — 31 May 1997) was a Honduran football defender.

Club career
Nicknamed Furia, (Spanish for "Fury") Solís played for Honduran giants Olimpia in the Honduran National League during the 1950s and 1960s. He played in the 1961 Championship of Central America and the Caribbean. He was also part of Platense's squad when they became the first Honduran League champions in 1966.

International career
The left-sided Solís had represented his country in 8 FIFA World Cup qualification matches

Retirement and death
After his football career, Solís was manager of the National Commission for Sports Facilities and Improvement. He died, aged 62, of cardiac arrest in 1997.

References

External links
 Picture of Solís - El Heraldo

1935 births
1997 deaths
Association football defenders
Honduran footballers
Honduras international footballers
C.D. Federal players
C.D. Olimpia players
Platense F.C. players
F.C. Motagua players
Liga Nacional de Fútbol Profesional de Honduras players
Sportspeople from Tegucigalpa